"Rat Is Dead (Rage)" is a song from Brazilian band CSS.

It was released on April 28, 2008, as the first single from their second album, Donkey. The song was made available as a free download on the band's official website on April 28, 2008. Adriano Cintra has said that this song, together with "Give Up", are the rockiest songs on the album. He also said that "Rat Is Dead (Rage)" is almost grunge.

Music video
A music video for the song was directed by Nima Nourizadeh. The video consists of the band playing the song in one continuous take. It can be seen on YouTube.

Notes

CSS (band) songs
2008 singles
Songs written by Adriano Cintra
2008 songs
Sub Pop singles